Book of Days may refer to:

Literature 
 Fasti (poem), known in English as the "Book of Days", a Latin poem by Ovid
Chambers Book of Days, by Robert Chambers
The Wicca Book of Days by Gerina Dunwich 
Gorillas Among Us: A Primate Ethnographer's Book of Days by Dawn Prince-Hughes
Men Are from Mars, Women Are from Venus Book of Days by John Gray
Book of Days by China Bayles 
The diary of Stanislaus Joyce that he called his "Book of Days”
Book of Days, a 2000 play by Lanford Wilson

Music 
The Celtic Book of Days, a 1998 album David Arkenstone
"Book of Days" (song), a 1992 single by Enya
Book of Days (The Psychedelic Furs album), 1989
Book of Days (Nektar album), 2008
Book of Days (Meredith Monk album), 1990
Book of Days, a 2003 album by Susan Crowe

Other 
Book of Days, a 2003 film, starring Wil Wheaton and Isaac Hayes